Trikokkia is a village and a community of the Deskati municipality. Before the 2011 local government reform it was part of the municipality of Chasia, of which it was a municipal district. The 2011 census recorded 235 inhabitants in the village and 469 inhabitants in the community. The community of Trikokkia covers an area of 68.646 km2.

Administrative division
The community of Trikokkia consists of 3 settlements:
 Anoixi (population 93)
 Trifylli (population 141)
 Trikokkia (population 235)
The aforementioned population figures are as of 2011.

See also
 List of settlements in the Grevena regional unit

References

Populated places in Grevena (regional unit)